San Vicente de Tagua Tagua, or just San Vicente, is a Chilean commune and city in Cachapoal Province, O'Higgins Region.

Demographics
Of these, 21,965 (54.6%) lived in urban areas and 18,288 (45.4%) in rural areas. The population grew by 14.5% (5,086 persons) between the 1992 and 2002 censuses. The 2012 census reported 44,046 inhabitants, an increase of 9.4% from 2002 to 2012.

Administration
As a commune, San Vicente is a third-level administrative division administered by a municipal council, headed by an alcalde who is directly elected every four years.

Within the electoral divisions of Chile, San Vicente is represented in the Chamber of Deputies by Alejandra Sepúlveda (PRI) and Javier Macaya (UDI) as part of the 34th electoral district, together with San Fernando, Chimbarongo, Peumo, Pichidegua and Las Cabras. The commune is represented in the Senate by  Andrés Chadwick Piñera (UDI) and Juan Pablo Letelier Morel (PS) as part of the 9th senatorial constituency (O'Higgins Region).

Archaeology
Tagua-Tagua represents a very early Paleo-Indian archaeological site, and it is dated to 11,380 ±380 14C yr BP (before present).

This is an ancient pleistocene site where humans butchered large animals that they hunted. The site was discovered in the 1860s.

An upper, younger stratum is about 1 m below the surface. The older stratum is about 2.4 m below the surface, and contains chipped stone tools. Horse and mastodon remains are represented, as well as smaller animals.

Notes and references

External links
  Municipality of San Vicente de Tagua Tagua

Communes of Chile
Populated places in Cachapoal Province
Pre-Clovis archaeological sites in the Americas